The earliest Medal of Honor recipient educated at the United States Military Academy was John Cleveland Robinson, a non-graduating member of the class of 1839. The first alumnus of the United States Military Academy (USMA) to perform actions to be recognized with the Medal of Honor was Charles Henry Tompkins, a non-graduating member of the class of 1851, while the last alumnus to perform actions so recognized was Andre Lucas, a graduating member of the class of 1954.

There are ten wars involving the United States for which the Medal of Honor has been bestowed upon a USMA alumnus. More than half of the alumni who received the distinction were thereby recognized for actions in either the American Civil War or the American Indian Wars; twenty-five alumni were awarded the medal in connection with the Civil War and twenty-one in connection with the Indian Wars. Four alumni were recognized for their contributions to the Spanish–American War, nine for the Philippine–American War, two for the Boxer Rebellion, and one for the Banana Wars. While only one alumnus received the Medal of Honor for actions in World War I, ten alumni were so recognized for actions in World War II. The final two conflicts for which the Medal of Honor was given to USMA alumni are the Korean War, for which two alumni were recognized, and the Vietnam War, for which eight alumni were recognized.

Of the eighty-three USMA alumni who have received the Medal of Honor, eight were non-graduates: John Cleveland Robinson, Charles Henry Tompkins, John Alexander Logan, Jr., Louis J. Van Schaick, Eli Thompson Fryer, Michael J. Daly, Roger Donlon, and James A. Gardner. Two graduates, John Gregory Bourke (class of 1869) and Calvin Pearl Titus (class of 1905), received the Medal of Honor before being appointed to the academy. Other notable Academy alumni who received the Medal of Honor include William Harding Carter, Douglas MacArthur, and Humbert Roque Versace.



Medal of Honor recipients
Note: "Class year" refers to the alumnus's class year, which usually is the same year they graduated. However, in times of war, classes often graduate early.
ex: after the class year indicates the alumni is a non-graduating member of that class.

American Civil War
All of the USMA alumni who received the Medal of Honor for action in the American Civil War were part of the Union Army fighting against the Confederate States Army to undo the secession of the Confederate States of America. The Civil War was the first war for which the Medal of Honor was granted, and more USMA alumni received this honor for participation in the Civil War than for any other conflict. Of the 3464 American Civil War Medal of Honor recipients, 25 attended USMA.

American Indian Wars
The USMA alumni receiving the Medal of Honor for their efforts in the American Indian Wars fought against the Native Americans in the United States in order to expand the territory controlled by American settlers and the federal government of the United States. Among the American Indian Wars Medal of Honor recipients, 21 were USMA alumni.

Spanish–American War
The Medal of Honor was given to Americans who fought in the Spanish–American War against Spain under the Restoration during the Cuban War of Independence. Four USMA alumni were among the Spanish–American War Medal of Honor recipients.

Philippine–American War
USMA alumni who received the Medal of Honor for participating in the Philippine–American War fought against the First Philippine Republic, the Katipunan, the Pulahan, the Sultanate of Sulu, and the Moro people in order to suppress the Philippine Declaration of Independence. Nine USMA alumni were among the 86 men who received the medal for their involvement in this war.

Boxer Rebellion
The Medal of Honor was given to two USMA alumni who fought in the Boxer Rebellion in China against the Righteous Harmony Society of the Qing Dynasty in order to defend foreigners and Christians in China. Another 57 Americans received the Medal of Honor for participating in this conflict.

Banana Wars
Eli Thompson Fryer is the sole USMA alumnus to have received the Medal of Honor for his involvement in the Banana Wars, supporting the United States occupation of Veracruz. All of the 62 other Americans who received the Medal of Honor for fighting in the Banana Wars were involved specifically in the occupation of Veracruz.

World War I
The United States' involvement in World War I was as a neutral party for most of the war, but included the deployment of expeditionary forces towards the end of the war. Of the 119 Americans who received the Medal of Honor for action in World War I, only one attended USMA: Emory Jenison Pike.

World War II
At the beginning of World War II, the United States was a neutral party just as it was at the beginning of World War I. Unlike in World War I, however, the United States was involved in World War II in a military capacity for most of the war. Ten of the 464 men who received the Medal of Honor for action in World War II were educated at USMA.

Korean War
The United States and twenty other member states of the United Nations supported South Korea in repelling an invasion by North Korea and its allies into South Korea. For their involvement, 133 Americans were presented with the Medal of Honor, two of whom attended USMA.

Vietnam War
The United States and other anti-communist countries fought against North Vietnam and its communist allies during the Vietnam War in an attempt to prevent the communist takeover of South Vietnam and, more broadly, to implement the United States' policy of containment to prevent the spread of communism. Eight of the 246 men who received the Medal of Honor for fighting in this war attended USMA.

See also
 List of American Civil War generals
 List of Medal of Honor recipients

References

Bibliography

External links
 Home of Heroes: West Point Medal of Honor recipients
 Medal of Honor recipients buried at Arlington National Cemetery at www.arlingtoncemetery.net (Unofficial website)

West Point
United States Army
West Point
Academy alumni, famous list
United States Army officers
Med